"Freaks" is a song by Australian DJ, producer and musician Timmy Trumpet and New Zealand rapper Savage released on 8 August 2014. The song topped the singles chart in New Zealand, was a top 3 hit in Australia, and charted in other countries such as France, Belgium, Hungary, Sweden, Poland and The Netherlands. 
It was certified gold by the Recording Industry Association of America for sales exceeding 500,000 copies, six times platinum by the Australian Recording Industry Association for sales exceeding 420,000 copies and triple platinum by Recorded Music NZ for sales exceeding 45,000 copies. Freaks has exceeded more than 500,000 streams online.

Freaks debuted on the ARIA Charts at number 1 in both Dance and Australian Singles, and number 10 overall. It is the highest selling single of all time on Ministry of Sound Australia and won "Highest Selling Single" at the 2015 New Zealand Music Awards.

Track listing
Ministry of Sound (Australia)
"Freaks" (radio edit) – 2:48
541 / N.E.W.S. (Belgium)
"Freaks" (radio edit) – 2:48
"Freaks" (extended mix) – 4:24
"Freaks" (original mix without Savage) – 4:34

Charts

Weekly charts

Year-end charts

Decade-end charts

Certifications

In popular culture 
"Freaks" was featured in a 2014 viral video recorded by Russell Bauer (who, in 2017, became director of the New England Conservatorium of Music in Armidale, New South Wales), "When Mama Isn't Home". In the video, Bauer is seen playing the song on trombone, with his son accompanying him by slamming an oven door to the beat. The video inspired remixes and variations of the video with other songs, and was also used as the basis of a commercial by German retailer Otto.

References

2014 songs
2014 singles
Ministry of Sound singles
Timmy Trumpet songs
Savage (rapper) songs
Universal Music Group singles